Crassocephalum bougheyanum is a species of flowering plant in the family Asteraceae. It is found in Cameroon and Equatorial Guinea. Its natural habitat is subtropical or tropical dry forests. It is threatened by habitat loss.

References

bougheyanum
Flora of Cameroon
Flora of Equatorial Guinea
Near threatened plants
Taxonomy articles created by Polbot